This is a list of films produced in the Netherlands during the 1940s. The films are produced in the Dutch language.

1940s
Films
Lists of 1940s films